Antoine Konrad (born 23 June 1975), better known as DJ Antoine, is a Swiss house DJ and record producer from Basel. He has a number of successful single and album releases in Western Europe, in particular Switzerland, Germany and France.

Musical career

Beginnings
DJ Antoine was born in Sissach, Basel-Landschaft. His career officially took off in 1995, when he opened his club, House Café, in the city of Basel. This club was a benchmark for the progress of the musical scene in Basel and its cult-parties are still in fond memories. After a short trip into the Swiss hip hop scene, DJ Antoine quickly switched genre. In 1998, he released his first album "DJ Antoine – The Pumpin' House Mix". In 2001, his album Houseworks 1 won him his first gold award. After that, things started to move very fast. To this day, DJ Antoine has published just over 50 albums, strongly establishing himself in the music and clubbing scene. Since 2003, he has been hosting his own weekly radio show, which is broadcast by radio stations all over the world. He is also famous for attending BIEF at Università Bocconi in Milan, he graduated with a 21L,

International breakthrough
In 2006, DJ Antoine gained international popularity with his live album DJ Antoine – Live in Moscow and the 2007 released single This Time. Ever since, he has been a highly demanded act in popular and trendy clubs all over the world. Gigs in New York, Chicago, Miami, Montreal, Moscow, Dubai, Bangkok, Oslo, Vienna and Cairo have turned into a regular but exciting part of his everyday life. Acknowledging his international success, All Around the World Records—the electronic music label owned by Universal Music UK, Blanco y Negro Spain, Happy Music France, EMI Music South Africa, Ultra Records USA and Kontor Records Germany—signed the single "This Time" in 2009.
 
In 2001, DJ Antoine received an Ericsson Dance Music Award for Most Successful Artist of the Year 2000 in the category House / UK Garage / Progressive House. In 2008, he created a stir with his sociocritical album DJ Antoine –Stop!, on which he openly spoke out against juvenile violence, calling for more civil courage. In early 2009, the record was priced with a Swiss Music Award for Best National Dance Album. The following year, he defended that title with his album DJ Antoine – 2009, receiving the Swiss Prix Walo for his work. In 2010, he reached another level of success in Switzerland: His album DJ Antoine – 2010 was certified with a platinum record. It again was nominated for a Swiss Music Award in the category Best National Dance Album.
 
In the studio DJ Antoine works with his long-time business partner Fabio Antoniali, also known as "Mad Mark". Well-known musicians such as Mary J. Blige, P. Diddy, Pitbull, Sean Paul, Afrojack, Cyndi Lauper, Robin S. and Roberto Blanco have had their tracks exclusively remixed by the two artists. In 2010, DJ Antoine produced songs for Timati, Snoop Dogg, DJ Smash and Bob Sinclar. That same year, house legend Mr. Mike joined the team as a vocalist, also accompanying the DJ to selected performances.
 
Another highlight of his career marks a collaboration with Russian rapper Timati and American singer Kalenna for the hit single Welcome to St. Tropez, which was released in Germany and Austria by the successful German dance label Kontor Records. It became a top-5-hit in the entire German-speaking room and grew DJ Antoine's popularity in many European countries. His 2012 released single Ma Chérie became the most successful production in his career with more than 1 million units sold, several gold and platinum awards and an MTV European Music Award for Best Swiss Act in 2012. Both singles and another collaboration with P. Diddy, Timati and Dirty Money called I'm On You were a part of his 2011 released and gold-certified album Welcome To DJ Antoine.

From this time forward, DJ Antoine and his studio partner Mad Mark produced four more albums which charted regularly in Switzerland and partly in other European countries. Especially his 2013 released album Sky Is The Limit became a huge commercial success reaching the top of Switzerland's album charts and the top-10 in Germany. It was certified with a platinum award in Switzerland and a gold award in Germany. Holiday, a collaboration with American singer Akon in 2015, marked the highlight of his 2016 released album Provocateur with chart presence in Switzerland, Germany, Austria, France and Belgium.
 
Labels like Maurice Lacroix, Perrier-Jouët "Belle Epoque" champagne and the Swiss custom tailor SuitArt have all worked with him. For VIP events, DJ Antoine has collaborated with companies such as Sony Ericsson, Campari, Moonlight, Edo Popken, Chrysler, Dodge, Maybach, Cadillac, HTC, Moët Hennessy, J. Lindeberg, Paco Rabanne and the German TV station Pro7. Furthermore, in 2015 DJ Antoine was a jury member in Germany's biggest TV Casting-Show Deutschland sucht den Superstar
 
Alongside his work as a DJ, Antoine Konrad manages his own production and booking companies Global Productions GmbH and Global Bookings. For his VIP events, he regularly tries to create extensive and individual concepts, in tune with the clients' and guests' needs and wishes. His exclusive event concepts want to represent lifestyle and luxury and seek to inspire his guests. Therefore, DJ Antoine found his own lifestyle company Konrad Lifestyle AG in 2016. His team currently consists of ten employees, based in Switzerland.

Antoine has sold over 8,000,000 units of singles and albums and runs his own label Houseworks. He has gained popularity all over Europe and overseas in Canada and the United States.

Discography 

Studio albums
 Stop! (2008)
 2008 (2008)
 A Weekend at Hotel Campari (2008)
 2009 (2009)
 Superhero? (2009)
 17900 (2009)
 2010 (2010)
 WOW (2010)
 2011 (2011)
 Welcome to DJ Antoine (2011)
 Sky Is the Limit (2013)
 We Are the Party (2014)
 Provocateur (2016)
 The Time Is Now (2018)

References

External links
Official website

1975 births
Club DJs
Swiss DJs
Living people
Swiss house musicians
People from Basel-Landschaft
Progressive house musicians
House musicians
Electronic dance music DJs
MTV Europe Music Award winners